Arnold Brügger (1888–1975) was a Swiss painter.

References
This article was initially translated from the German Wikipedia.

20th-century Swiss painters
Swiss male painters
1888 births
1975 deaths
20th-century Swiss male artists